This is a list of newspapers in Sudan. It comprises both daily newspapers as well as general news magazines, published both by Sudanese journalists working in Sudan and abroad, in print and/or online version.

Arabic language newspapers

A–M
 Akhbar Al Youm
Al Ayaam
 Akhir Lahza
 El Baath El Sudani (print runs confiscated 11 times in early 2019 during 2018–19 Sudanese protests; editor-in-chief Mohamed Widaa assaulted on 24 July 2019; office raided on 29 July 2019)
 Goan (http://www.goansport.net)
 Khartoum Star (https://khartoumstar.com)
Al Mshaheer
 Al-Mushahid Al-riyadiya (https://web.archive.org/web/20111119110704/http://www.mushahidsd.net/)

N–Z
sudan independent 
 Al-Nilin
 Al-Osboa
 Ray' al-Shaab
 Al-Ray al-Aam
Radio Dabanga 
 Al-Sadda (http://www.alsadda.net)
 Al-Sahafa (Sudan)
 Sudan Daily (https://sudandaily.org)
Sudan Vision
 Sudanese Online (http://sudaneseonline.com)
 Sudanese Society (https://www.sudanesesociety.com)
 Al-Sudani (http://www.alsudani.info)
 Al-Taghyeer Newspaper

English language newspapers
 Sudanese Voice (https://www.sudanesevoice.com) 
 Khartoum Monitor
 Khartoum Star (https://khartoumstar.com/en)
 Sudan Daily (https://sudandaily.org/en)
 Al-Taghyeer Newspaper
 The Vigilant (1965-1969)

Bilingual Arabic/English news magazines 

 Andariya magazine (digital cultural platform from Sudan, South Sudan & Uganda, cultural and sociopolitical features)

See also
 Media of Sudan
 Telecommunications in Sudan

References

External links
 'Media and Telecommunication Landscape in Soudan and South Soudan', a 'infoasaid' guide, February 2011, 92 pp.
 
 
 

Sudan
Newspapers, List of